The Minnesota–Croatia National Guard Partnership is one of 25 European partnerships that make up the U.S. European Command State Partnership Program and one of 88 worldwide partnerships that make-up the National Guard State Partnership Program. The partnership began in July 1996 and has progressed from small unit exchanges to deployments as Operational Mentoring and Liaison Teams (OMLT) in support of Operation Enduring Freedom (OEF). The partnership continues to support overseas contingency operations; assist in the development of disaster preparedness and consequence management, and support the EUCOM Commander's Security Cooperation Objectives (military transformation, interoperability, civil-military operations, and regional military-to-military and civil security events).

History
 The partnership began in July 1996.
 Croatia’s accession into NATO in 2009 was based on their participation in NATO’s Partnership for Peace exercises starting in 2000.
 National elections were held December 4, 2011. There was a major transition of power from Croatian Democratic Union HDZ Party (Hrvatska demokratska zajednica) to Kukuriku (Social Democratic Party).
 Croatia applied for EU membership in 2003, and Joined the alliance in 2013

Partnership focus
The events within the scope of the MNNG capabilities in the SPP will continue with emphasis on Crisis Response, building a Reserve Force, Support to Civilian Authorities with the intent to execute a responsible transition from Military-to-Military to Civilian-to-Civilian events. The MNNG is making a deliberate effort to partner Croatian Government leaders with Minnesota State Government entities for CIV/CIV engagements with the intent to facilitate planning fusion for CIV/CIV discussions on future trade relations with MN and Croatian international and domestic business leaders.

2013 Planned Events:
 Defense Support to Civilian Authorities
 Cyber Defense
 Rotary Wing Aviation
 Chaplaincy
 UAV Tactics

2014 Proposed Events:
 Defense Support to Civilian Authorities
 Cyber Defense
 Rotary Wing Aviation

2019 Focus:
 TBD

2020 Focus:
TBD

References

External links
 The EUCOM State Partnership page for Minnesota-Croatia
 The Minnesota NG State Partnership Program webpage
 Department of Defense News on the Minnesota-Croatia Partnership
 EUCOM SPP
 National Guard Bureau SPP
 National Guard Bureau SPP News Archives
 The Current Minnesota Adjutant General

Minnesota National Guard
Military alliances involving the United States
Croatia–United States military relations